The 1854 United States House of Representatives elections in New York were held on November 7, 1854, to elect 33 U.S. Representatives to represent the State of New York in the United States House of Representatives of the 34th United States Congress, and two representatives to fill vacancies in the 33rd United States Congress.

Background
33 U.S. Representatives had been elected in November 1852 to a term in the 33rd United States Congress, beginning on March 4, 1853. Gilbert Dean was appointed to the New York Supreme Court and resigned his seat on July 3, 1854; Gerrit Smith resigned his seat on August 7, 1854; leaving vacancies in the 12th and the 22nd District. The other representatives' term would end on March 3, 1855. The elections were held with the annual State election on the Tuesday after the first Monday in November, about four months before the congressional term began, and a little more than a year before Congress actually met on December 3, 1855.

Congressional districts
The geographical area of the congressional districts remained the same as at the previous elections in 1852, which were apportioned by the New York State Legislature on July 10, 1851. In 1854, the City of Williamsburgh was annexed by the City of Brooklyn, and became the 13th through 16th Ward of Brooklyn. It is unclear if the annexation happened before or after this election.
The 1st District comprising Queens, Suffolk and Richmond counties; and Kings County except the cities of Brooklyn and Williamsburgh.
The 2nd District comprising the City of Brooklyn, as it existed before the annexation of the City of Williamsburgh, i.e. the first 12 wards of Brooklyn after the consolidation.
The 3rd District comprising the 1st, 2nd, 3rd, 5th and 8th Ward of New York City.
The 4th District comprising the 4th, 6th, 10th and 14th Ward of New York City.
The 5th District comprising the 7th and the 13th Ward of New York City; and the City of Williamsburgh, from 1854 on the 13th, 14th, 15th and 16th Ward of Brooklyn.
The 6th District comprising the 11th, 15th and 17th Ward of New York City.
The 7th District comprising the 9th, 16th and 20th Ward of New York City.
The 8th District comprising the 12th, 18th, 19th, 21st and 22nd Ward of New York City.
The 9th District comprising Rockland, Westchester and Putnam counties.
The 10th District comprising Orange and Sullivan counties.
The 11th District comprising Ulster and Greene counties.
The 12th District comprising Dutchess and Columbia counties.
The 13th District comprising Rensselaer County.
The 14th District comprising Albany County.
The 15th District comprising Saratoga, Washington, Hamilton and Warren counties.
The 16th District comprising Clinton, Essex and Franklin counties.
The 17th District comprising Herkimer and St. Lawrence counties.
The 18th District comprising Montgomery, Fulton, Schenectady and Schoharie counties.
The 19th District comprising Delaware and Otsego counties.
The 20th District comprising Oneida County.
The 21st District comprising Chenango, Broome and Cortland counties.
The 22nd District comprising Madison and Oswego counties.
The 23rd District comprising Jefferson and Lewis counties.
The 24th District comprising Onondaga County.
The 25th District comprising Cayuga and Wayne counties.
The 26th District comprising Ontario, Seneca, and Yates counties.
The 27th District comprising Chemung, Schuyler, Tioga and Tompkins counties. 
The 28th District comprising Steuben and Livingston counties.
The 29th District comprising Monroe County.
The 30th District comprising Allegany, Genesee and Wyoming counties. 
The 31st District comprising Niagara and Orleans counties.
The 32nd District comprising Erie County.
The 33rd District comprising Cattaraugus and Chautauqua counties.

Note: There are now 62 counties in the State of New York. Bronx and Nassau counties had not yet been established. The area of the Bronx was at this time in Westchester County; and the area of Nassau in Queens County.

Result
25 Whigs, 4 Softs, 3 Know Nothings and 1 Hard were elected to the 34th Congress; and 2 Whigs were elected to fill the vacancies in the 33rd Congress. The incumbents Wheeler, Sage, Simmons, Matteson, Bennett, Morgan, Oliver, Pringle, Flagler and Haven were re-elected; the incumbents Walsh, Hughes, Hastings, Carpenter and Fenton were defeated.

Note: For candidates running on more than one ticket, the number of votes is the total polled on all tickets.

Aftermath
Isaac Teller and Henry C. Goodwin took their seats in the 33rd United States Congress at the beginning of the second session on December 4, 1854.

The House of Representatives of the 34th United States Congress met for the first time at the United States Capitol in Washington, D.C., on December 3, 1855. Thomas Child, Jr., never took his seat, due to a prolonged illness.

Orsamus B. Matteson resigned his seat on February 27, 1857; and Francis S. Edwards and William A. Gilbert resigned on February 28. The three seats remained vacant for the remaining days of this Congress.

Notes

Sources
The New York Civil List compiled in 1858 (see: pg. 67 for district apportionment; pg. 76 for Congressmen)
Members of the 34th United States Congress
The Tribune Almanac for 1855 edited by Horace Greeley (page 42)
OOFICIAL CANVASS 1854 in NYT on December 21, 1854
Temperance Congressional Convention in the First District in NYT on November 1, 1854
Whig Congressional Nominations;... Democratic Nominations in NYT on October 18, 1854
City Nominations for Congress, Assembly, and City and County Offices in NYT on November 1, 1854

See also
New York state election, 1854

1854
United States House of Representatives
New York